Torre delle Saline may refer to:
, a tower in Manduria, Apulia, Italy
, a tower in Stintino, Sardinia, Italy
, a tower and fort in Albinia, Tuscany, Italy
Għallis Tower, a tower in Naxxar, Malta